Warla may refer to:
 Warla, Madhya Pradesh, a village in India
 Warla tehsil, the large administrative unit
 Warla, Achham, a village in Nepal

See also 
 Worla